Sirocco, scirocco, or, rarely, siroc (see  below) is a Mediterranean wind that comes from the Sahara and can reach hurricane speeds in North Africa and Southern Europe, especially during the summer season.

Names
Sirocco derives from šurūq, verbal noun of šaraqa, related to the East, aš-šarq. Various names for this wind in other languages include: 
 
 
 
  
  
  or 
 , or  romanized: sirókos
 
  or rarely širok
  or 
 Libyan Arabic: , romanized: , which means 'coming from the Qibla'
 , which means 'fifty' ('fifty-day wind')
 , pronounced širguī

The Roman poet Horace refers to the sirocco at Trevico in Apulia as "Atabulus" (a Messapic word) in his account of his journey to Brundisium in 37 BC.

Development
Siroccos arise from warm, dry, tropical air masses that are pulled northward by low-pressure cells moving eastward across the Mediterranean Sea, with the wind originating in the Arabian or Sahara deserts. The hotter, drier continental air mixes with the cooler, wetter air of the maritime cyclone, and the counter-clockwise circulation of the low propels the mixed air across the southern coasts of Europe.

Effects
The sirocco causes dusty dry conditions along the northern coast of Africa, storms in the Mediterranean Sea, and warm wet weather in Southern Europe. Sirocco doesn't affect other parts of Europe. The sirocco's duration may be as short as half a day or may last several days. While passing over the Mediterranean Sea, the sirocco picks up moisture; this results in rainfall in the southern part of Italy, known locally as "blood rain" due to the red sand mixed with the falling rain.

Sirocco is commonly perceived as causing unease and an irritable mood in people. In addition, many people attribute health problems to the wind, either because of the heat and dust brought from African coastal regions, or because of the cool dampness further north in Europe. The dust within the sirocco winds can cause abrasion in mechanical devices and penetrate buildings.

They reach a peak in March and in November when it is very hot.

When combined with a rising tide, the sirocco can cause the acqua alta phenomenon in the Venetian Lagoon.

This wind also has an impact on fishing. For example, the anchovies caught in the Gulf of Trieste near Barcola, which are in great demand as a delicacy, are only caught in Sirocco. In cold winds, like the bora, the fish disappear into the vastness of the Adriatic.

See also
Foehn wind: warm downslope winds
Santa Ana winds: wind phenomenon observed in California
Studio Ghibli § Name

References

External links

Winds of the world
Local Mediterranean winds 

Winds
Environment of the Mediterranean
Sahara
Climate of Africa
Climate of Europe
Climate of Greece
Climate of Malta
Environment of Libya
Italian words and phrases